In British English, haslet or acelet is a pork meatloaf with herbs, originally from Lincolnshire. The word is derived from the Old French  meaning entrails. In Lincolnshire, haslet (pronounced '/ˈhæslɪt/' locally) is typically made from stale white bread, minced pork, sage, salt and black pepper. It is typically served cold with pickles and salad, or as a sandwich filling. In England, it is occasionally sold on a delicatessen counter.

Welsh haslet is traditionally made from finely minced potatoes, pigs' liver and onions.

In North American English, "haslet" refers to the "edible viscera of a butchered animal".

References

English cuisine
Lunch meat
Lincolnshire cuisine
Pork dishes